Bobry  is a village in the Administrative District of Gmina Chorzele, within Przasnysz County, Masovian Voivodeship, in east-central Poland.

References

Bobry